The Order of precedence in New Zealand is a guide to the relative seniority of constitutional office holders and certain others, to be followed, as appropriate at State and official functions. The previous order of precedence (approved and amended) is revoked and Her Majesty The Queen approved the following Order of Precedence in New Zealand effective 8 September 2022:
 The King of New Zealand.
 His Majesty King Charles III (8 September 2022)
 The Governor-General or, while acting in the place of the Governor-General, the officer administering the Government
 Her Excellency The Rt Hon. Dame Cindy Kiro  (21 October 2021)
 The Prime Minister
 The Rt Hon. Chris Hipkins  (25 January 2023)
 The Speaker of the House of Representatives
 The Rt Hon. Adrian Rurawhe  (24 August 2022)
 The Chief Justice
 The Rt Hon. Dame Helen Winkelmann  (14 March 2019)
 The Dean of the Diplomatic Corps
 His Excellency Ahmad Salem Alwehaib of Kuwait (13 September 2022)
 The Deputy Prime Minister 
 The Hon. Carmel Sepuloni  (25 January 2023)
 Ministers of the Crown (ordered by ministerial rank; list as of 1 February 2023)
 The Hon. Kelvin Davis 
 The Hon. Grant Robertson 
 The Hon. Dr Megan Woods 
 The Hon. Jan Tinetti 
 The Hon. Michael Wood 
 The Hon. Dr Ayesha Verrall 
 The Hon. Willie Jackson 
 The Hon. Kiri Allan 
 The Hon. Stuart Nash 
 The Hon. Damien O'Connor 
 The Hon. Andrew Little 
 The Hon. David Parker 
 The Hon. Peeni Henare 
 The Hon. Nanaia Mahuta 
 The Hon. Priyanca Radhakrishnan 
 The Hon. Kieran McAnulty 
 The Hon. Ginny Andersen 
 The Hon. Barbara Edmonds 
 Ministers Outside of Cabinet
 The Hon. Meka Whaitiri 
 The Hon. Duncan Webb 
 The Hon. Willow-Jean Prime 
 The Hon. Rino Tirikatene 
 The Hon. Deborah Russell 
 Support Party Ministers
 The Hon. Marama Davidson 
 The Hon. James Shaw 
 Former Governors-General
 The Rt Hon. Sir Michael Hardie Boys  (1996–2001)
 The Hon. Dame Silvia Cartwright  (2001–2006)
 The Rt Hon. Sir Anand Satyanand  (2006–2011)
 The Rt Hon. Sir Jerry Mateparae  (2011–2016)
 The Rt Hon. Dame Patsy Reddy  (2016–2021)
 Ambassadors and High Commissioners in New Zealand and Chargés d’Affaires accredited to New Zealand.
 The Leader of the Opposition in the House of Representatives
 Christopher Luxon  (30 November 2021)
 Leaders, including co-leaders and joint leaders, of political parties represented in the House of Representatives, other than Ministers of the Crown.
 David Seymour  – Leader, ACT New Zealand (4 October 2014)
 Debbie Ngarewa-Packer  – Co-leader, Māori Party (15 April 2020)
 Rawiri Waititi  – Co-leader, Māori Party (28 October 2020)
 Members of the House of Representatives. There is no established order of precedence over members of parliament in general, although each party has its internal ranking.
Judges of the Supreme Court of New Zealand, the Court of Appeal and the High Court of New Zealand.
 Former Prime Ministers, former Speakers of the House of Representatives, former Chief Justices, and members of the Privy Council.
 Until 1999 it was traditional for the Prime Minister, senior and long-serving Ministers of the Crown, the Chief Justice and Judges of the Court of Appeal to be appointed to the Privy Council. No appointments were made from 2000, and in 2010 steps were taken to discontinue such appointments.
 Former Prime Ministers
 The Rt Hon. Sir Geoffrey Palmer  (8 August 1989 – 4 September 1990)
 The Rt Hon. Jim Bolger  (2 November 1990 – 8 December 1997)
 The Rt Hon. Dame Jenny Shipley  (8 December 1997 – 10 December 1999)
 The Rt Hon. Helen Clark  (10 December 1999 – 19 November 2008)
 The Rt Hon. Sir John Key  (19 November 2008 – 12 December 2016)
 The Rt Hon. Sir Bill English  (12 December 2016 – 26 October 2017)
 The Rt Hon. Jacinda Ardern  (26 October 2017 – 25 January 2023)
 Former Speakers of the House of Representatives
 The Hon. Sir Kerry Burke (16 September 1987 – 28 November 1990)
 The Hon. Sir Doug Kidd  (12 December 1996 – 20 December 1999)
 The Rt Hon. Jonathan Hunt  (20 December 1999 – 3 March 2005)
 The Hon. Margaret Wilson  (3 March 2005 – 8 December 2008)
 The Rt Hon. Sir Lockwood Smith  (8 December 2008 – 31 January 2013)
 The Rt Hon. Sir David Carter  (31 January 2013 – 7 November 2017)
 The Rt Hon. Trevor Mallard (7 November 2017 – 24 August 2022)
 Former Chief Justices
 The Rt Hon. Dame Sian Elias  (17 May 1999 – 13 March 2019)
 Members of the Privy Council
 The Rt Hon. Jonathan Hunt  (1 November 1989) (former Speaker of the House of Representatives, see above)
 The Rt Hon. Sir Michael Hardie Boys (1 November 1989) (former Governor-General, see above)
 The Rt Hon. Sir Don McKinnon  (8 April 1992)
 The Rt Hon. Sir Bill Birch  (8 April 1992)
 The Rt Hon. Sir John Henry  (19 November 1996)
 The Rt Hon. Sir Ted Thomas  (19 November 1996)
 The Rt Hon. Winston Peters (21 May 1998)
 The Rt Hon. Sir Doug Graham  (21 May 1998)
 The Rt Hon. Sir Kenneth Keith  (21 May 1998)
 The Rt Hon. Sir Peter Blanchard  (21 May 1998)
 The Rt Hon. Sir Andrew Tipping  (21 May 1998) 
 The Rt Hon. Wyatt Creech  (24 November 1999)
 The Rt Hon. Dame Sian Elias (24 November 1999) (Former Chief Justice, see above)
 The Rt Hon. Simon Upton (14 December 1999)
 Mayors of territorial authorities and chairpersons of regional councils, while in their own cities, districts and regions. In 1989, boroughs and counties were amalgamated into district councils. District mayors, and the Chatham Islands mayor could expect to be accorded this same precedence.
The Public Service Commissioner, Chief of Defence Force, Commissioner of Police, and Officers of Parliament (The Controller and Auditor-General, Chief Ombudsman, and the Parliamentary Commissioner for the Environment).
 The Public Service Commissioner – Peter Hughes  (4 July 2016)
 Chief of Defence Force – Air Vice Marshal Kevin Short (1 July 2018)
 Commissioner of Police – Andrew Coster (3 April 2020)
 Officers of Parliament
 Controller and Auditor-General – John Ryan (2 July 2018)
 Chief Ombudsman – Peter Boshier (10 December 2015)
 The Parliamentary Commissioner for the Environment – Rt Hon. Simon Upton (16 October 2017) (Member of the Privy Council, see above)
 The Solicitor-General, Clerk of the House of Representatives, and Clerk of the Executive Council when attending a function involving the exercise of the position’s specific responsibilities.
 The Solicitor-General – Una Jagose  (16 February 2016)
 The Clerk of the Parliament of New Zealand – David Wilson (6 July 2015)
 The Clerk of the Executive Council – Rachel Hayward (2 November 2022)
 Chief executives of public service and non-public service departments.
 The Vice Chief of Defence Force, and Chiefs of Navy, Army and Air Force, and other statutory office holders.
 Vice Chief of Defence Force Air Vice Marshal	Tony Davies  (10 September 2018)
 Chief of Navy – Rear Admiral David Proctor (29 November 2018)
 Chief of Army – Major General John Boswell  (1 September 2018)
 Chief of Air Force – Air Vice Marshal Andrew Clark (10 September 2018)
 Consuls-General and Consuls of countries without diplomatic representation in New Zealand.
 Members of New Zealand and British orders, and holders of decorations and medals in accordance with the Order of Wear in New Zealand.

References

Order of precedence
Orders of precedence
Order of precedence
Order of precedence